A project is any undertaking, carried out individually or collaboratively and possibly involving research or design, that is carefully planned to achieve a particular goal.

An alternative view sees a project managerially as a sequence of events: a "set of interrelated tasks to be executed over a fixed period and within certain cost and other limitations".

A project may be a temporary (rather than a permanent) social system (work system), possibly staffed by teams (within or across organizations) to accomplish particular tasks under time constraints.

A project may form a part of wider programme management
or function as an ad hoc system.

Open-source software "projects" or artists' musical "projects" (for example) may lack defined team-membership, precise planning and/or time-limited durations.

Overview 
The word project comes from the Latin word projectum from the Latin verb proicere, "before an action," which in turn comes from pro-, which denotes precedence, something that comes before something else in time (paralleling the Greek πρό) and iacere, "to do". The word "project" thus originally meant "before an action".

When the English language initially adopted the word, it referred to a plan of something, not to the act of actually carrying this plan out. Something performed in accordance with a project became known as an "object". Every project has certain phases of development.

Based on the Project Management Institute, a project can be defined as a "temporary endeavor" aimed to drive changes in teams, organizations, or societies. The output of a project is normally a unique product, service, or result.

Cancellation
Project cancellation is the termination of a project prior to its completion and generally includes the cessation of access to funding and other project resources. Project cancellation may result from cost overruns, schedule overruns, changes in budget, change or obviation of the goal of the project, political factors, or any combination of those and other factors. Contracts often stipulate the time and the manner in which a project may be cancelled.

Contracted projects typically have a specified end date, when the contract may or may not be renewed; nonrenewal often has the same effect as cancellation but carries different legal ramifications.

Formal definition in the project-management realm

A project consists of a concrete and organized effort motivated by a perceived opportunity when facing a problem, a need, a desire or a source of discomfort (e.g., lack of proper ventilation in a building). It seeks the realization of a unique and innovative deliverable, such as a product, a service, a process, or in some cases, a scientific research. Each project has a beginning and an end,
and as such is considered a closed dynamic system. It is developed along the 4 Ps of project management: Plan, Processes, People, and Power (e.g., line of authority). It is bound by the triple constraints that are calendar, costs and norms of quality,
each of which can be determined and measured objectively along the project lifecycle. Some projects produce some level of formal documentation, the deliverable(s), and some impacts, which can be positive and/or negative.

Specific uses

School and university 
A project is an individual or collaborative enterprise that is carefully planned and researched about by students. At schools, educational institutes and universities, a project is a research assignment - given to a student - which generally requires a larger amount of effort and more independent work than that involved in a normal essay assignment. It requires students to undertake their fact-finding and analysis, either from library/internet research or from gathering data empirically. The written report that comes from the project is usually in the form of a dissertation, which will contain sections on the project's inception, analysis, findings and conclusions.

Project management 

In project management, a project consists of a temporary endeavor undertaken to create a unique product, service or result. Another definition is a management environment that is created for the purpose of delivering one or more business products according to a specified business case. Projects can also be seen as temporary organizations.

Project objectives define target status at the end of the project, reaching of which is considered necessary for the achievement of planned benefits. They can be formulated as SMART criteria: Projects are often guided by a steering group.

 Specific
 Measurable (or at least evaluable) achievement
 Achievable (recently Agreed to or Acceptable are used regularly as well)
 Realistic (given the current state of organizational resources)
 Time terminated (bounded)

The evaluation (measurement) occurs at the project closure. However, a continuous guard on the project progress should be kept by monitoring and evaluating.

Civil and military construction and industry infrastructure
In civil, military and industry (e.g. oil and gas) infrastructure, capital projects refer to activities to construct and install equipment, facilities and buildings. As these activities are temporary endeavors with clear start and end dates, the term "project" is applied. Because the results of these activities are typically long-standing infrastructure, with a life measured in years or decades, these projects are typically accounted for in financial accounting as capital expenditures, and thus they are termed "capital projects".

Computer software 
In computer software, a project can consist of programs, configuration definitions and related data. For example, in Microsoft Visual Studio, a "solution" consists of projects and other definitions.

State project 
It can be defined as "a set of state policies and/or agencies unified around a particular issue or oppression". Therefore, these kinds of projects involve constant change and dynamism due to the social constructions that evolve among time. State projects have to adapt to the current moment. They are mostly community services based.

Infrastructure code 
In the context of infrastructure code, a project is a collection of code used to build a discrete component of the system. There is no rule on how much a single project or its component can include.

Types 
Some analyses of project-oriented activity distinguish - using military-style terminology - between grandiose strategic projects  and more trivial or component operational projects: tactical projects.

Examples 
 Human Genome Project, which mapped the human genome
 Manhattan Project, which developed the first nuclear weapon
 Polaris missile project: an ICBM control-system
 Apollo program, which landed humans on the moon
 Soviet atomic bomb project
 Soviet crewed lunar programs
 Project-706
 Great Pyramid of Giza

Topics associated with projects 

 Megaproject
 Program management
 Project governance
 Project Management Institute (PMI)
 International Project Management Association (IPMA)
 Project management software
 Project planning
 Small-scale project management
 PRINCE2

References 

 
 
Collaboration